Bodibe is a large town along National Road R503 in South Africa.

See also
Economy of South Africa
History of South Africa

References

Populated places in the Ditsobotla Local Municipality